Heinrich "Hanggi" Boller (September 6, 1921 – June 30, 2007), was an ice hockey player for the Swiss national team. He won a bronze medal at the 1948 Winter Olympics.

References 

1921 births
2007 deaths
Ice hockey people from Zürich
Ice hockey players at the 1948 Winter Olympics
Olympic bronze medalists for Switzerland
Olympic ice hockey players of Switzerland
Olympic medalists in ice hockey
Medalists at the 1948 Winter Olympics
ZSC Lions players